Marie Louise Gonzaga (18 August 1611 – 10 May 1667) was Queen of Poland and Grand Duchess of Lithuania by marriage to two kings of Poland and grand dukes of Lithuania, brothers Władysław IV and John II Casimir. Together with Bona Sforza (1494–1557), she is regarded as one of the most influential and powerful queen consorts of the Kingdom of Poland and the Polish–Lithuanian Commonwealth.

Born in Nevers to Charles I, Duke of Mantua and Catherine of Guise, Marie was brought up at the French court as the future bride of Duke Gaston of Orléans. In 1645, she married Władysław IV of Poland, with whom she did not have a harmonious relationship. After his death in 1648, the widowed queen married his half-brother and successor, John II Casimir. Marie Louise exuded considerable influence over her second husband and dictated the political course in the country. An ambitious and energetic woman, she was a strong supporter of an absolute monarchy, for which she was reviled by certain spheres of the Polish nobility. She, nevertheless, remained active in the Commonwealth's politics and co-sponsored the foundation of the first Polish newspaper, Merkuriusz Polski Ordynaryjny (Polish Mercury Ordinary), in 1661 as well as other public institutions. 

While her role is regarded as crucial in repulsing the foreign forces out of Poland-Lithuania during the Swedish Deluge (1655–1660), she became increasingly unpopular due to her absolutist policies and intention of nominating her niece's husband, Henri Jules, the future Prince of Condé, the heir apparent to the Polish throne. This resulted in a military conflict with the internal opposition, which ended with the defeat of the royal army in 1666, during Lubomirski's rebellion. Following Marie Louise's death, John Casimir in a hesitating position renounced the crown, and the Commonwealth's government officially curtailed the prerogatives of the royal consort.

Early life and marriage proposal
Marie Louise Gonzaga was born on 18 August 1611 in the city of Nevers, France to Charles I, Duke of Mantua, and Catherine of Guise, who died in 1618. Marie Louise was supposed to marry Gaston, Duke of Orléans in 1627, but King Louis XIII of France strongly opposed the marriage and subsequently imprisoned her in the Vincennes fortress and later in a small convent.

The first proposal that she'd marry the newly elected King of Poland and Grand Duke of Lithuania, Władysław IV Vasa, was made in 1634, but Władysław eventually married Cecilia Renata of Austria, the daughter of Ferdinand II, Holy Roman Emperor and Maria Anna of Bavaria. This decision was very unfavorable for France and greatly angered Louis XIII because of the newly established alliance between the Austrian Empire and the Polish–Lithuanian Commonwealth.

In 1640, Marie Louise met Władysław's brother, John Casimir with whom she had an early affair. She later invited Prince John Casimir to France for her annual literary salon organised in Paris.

Queen of Poland, politics and conflict with nobility

Following the death of Cecilia Renata in 1644, Cardinal Jules Mazarin was determined to diminish and destroy the alliance between the Polish Vasa dynasty and the Austrian Habsburg dynasty, the rivals of the French state and a possible future threat to France. Mazarin insisted that Marie Louise should marry the widowed sovereign and in cruel, but purposeful ways made sure that she was the only candidate.

Under the pressure of the French government and other Western nations Marie Louise Gonzaga finally married Władysław by proxy on 5 November 1645. The proper wedding of Marie Louise and Władysław IV took place in Warsaw on 10 March 1646. She was forced by the Polish parliament (Sejm) and the strongly zealous nobility to change her name from Marie Louise to Ludwika Maria in order for the marriage to take place, as in Poland the first name Maria was at that time considered reserved only for Mary, mother of Jesus.

Two years later, on 20 May 1648, Marie Louise was widowed by the sudden death of Władysław IV. John Casimir was eventually elected the next King of Poland by the parliament, and married her on 30 May 1649. During an 18-year marriage with John Casimir, she gave birth to two children, Maria Anna Teresa and John Sigismund, who died in infancy. She also suffered several miscarriages.

From the moment she officially became queen once more, Marie Louise immediately focused on influencing the political views of her new husband. Marie Louise believed that she was more able to control John Casimir rather than his deceased brother Władysław, who was described as extremely stubborn, self-centered and overwhelmingly supportive of the nobility, which Marie Louise opposed and sought to decrease the power of the nobles in the parliament. Intelligent, tenacious and with a strong personality, at many times she not only supported John Casimir, but guided him throughout entire political and several military campaigns. This was noticed by a Brandenburgian diplomat named Hoverberk who stated in his diaries that "by incessant insistence, molestation, complaints and other tricks she controlled the poor king and therefore the entire ill-fated country itself." In contrast to her husband, Marie Louise was reportedly not sympathetic towards the servants, peasants and lower classes, but sought to achieve the set goals and was determined to strengthen the Polish nation in case of war with the powerful and dangerous eastern empires - the Turkish Empire, Swedish Empire and Russian Empire.

Marie Louise was an active and energetic woman, with ambitious economic and political plans for the Polish–Lithuanian Commonwealth. The Polish nobility were scandalized at the queen's political meddling, believing that no foreign woman should interfere. Nevertheless, she played an instrumental role leading the Polish in repulsing the Swedish during the Swedish invasion of the Commonwealth, commonly known as the "Deluge". She wished to change the voting system of the Polish senate and grant the king more power. However, she was unable to do so as such actions would result in a rebellion of the higher and wealthy classes that could possibly devastate the economy of the Commonwealth. She had no qualms in order to achieve her objectives. Marie Louise opposed Poland's policy of religious toleration. She believed that Poland was a "place of shelter for heretics" and wanted them burnt at the stake.

Marie Louise made use of bribery and false promises to the aristocracy. She brought many noble ladies to the Polish court from France that would be obliged to marry voivodes, princes and wealthy landowners, and eventually serve as a defensive shield if the higher classes decide to rebel against the government, one of the most well known examples being her relative and favorite Klara Izabella Pacowa. Marie Louise also strongly followed French cultural patterns and introduced new French customs to the Commonwealth. She was known to always wear French clothing and collect small memorabilia like coins, jewelry and perfume bottles - this was a common practice during the reign of Louis XIII and subsequently Louis XIV.

Swedish invasion and hope for victory

All the features of the Marie Louise, the persistence and determination combined with great diligence and courage, were particularly highlighted during the Swedish invasion. Reportedly she risked her life on the front lines and after the defeat, forced to leave the capital, she did not lose her faith in victory and went to Silesia; thence she directed the army to fight against the invaders. She vividly tried to establish a contact with all citizens who resisted the Swedes. Marie also developed extensive diplomatic campaign aimed at receiving help from other European rulers and monarchs. To acquire the aid of the Habsburgs, she would not even hesitate to hand over the Polish throne following the death of John Casimir. She participated and also worked on setting the peace conditions with Sweden - Treaty of Oliwa.

During the invasion the queen reached the peak of her popularity, but that quickly passed after the presentation of the draft reform; the strengthening of royal power and election vivente rege (Latin meaning "for the life of the king"). At first, she used different methods to build up the party gathered around the court and started a propaganda campaign, which aimed to reform the public acceptance of the nobility. At the same time she was determined for her niece - Anne Henriette of Bavaria, whose husband was to be Henri Jules, Prince of Condé - to be the wife of the next elected King of Poland and Grand Duke of Lithuania. This enraged the wealthier classes and the nobles, who accused her of meddling Poland into French politics that were hostile towards England, Sweden, allied Austria and Russia.

At the beginning success was certain, because the majority of senators were in favour of her plans and opposed Jerzy Sebastian Lubomirski and broader masses of the nobility. This also influenced the peasants and lower classes and their attitude was reflected in the well-known saying and rhyme "Bij Francuzów bij, wziąwszy dobry kij, wal Francuzów wal, wbijaj ich na pal!" (Beat the French, impale the French...). To decide between the court and the opposition, however, there was no fighting in words, but on the battlefield. The so-called Sejm of Lubomirski sentenced Lubomirski to infamy and ordered the confiscation of his property. A proud magnate who believed that he would be elected the next king, Lubomirski has rejected the proposal of reconciliation and openly challenged King John II Casimir. In 1665, Lubomirski announced a rebellion and his army entered the Commonwealth. On 13 July 1666 he faced the royal army under the King himself at Mątwy. Lubomirski's forces were victorious.

In the aftermath of the battle, elite regiments of the royal Polish Army were executed by the rebels (in total, the army had lost almost 4,000 of its most experienced men). On 31 July, at the village of Legowice, the King and Lubomirski have signed an agreement. John II Casimir and Marie Louise were forced to give up their plans of reform and were obliged to declare amnesty for the rebels, while Lubomirski signed a letter of apology.

Death and legacy

The great effort put into the stabilization of the economy and the subsequent political disaster rapidly affected the health of the queen, who was suffering from fever, severe weight loss, constant coughing and a permanently bleeding nose. She was dying knowing the fact that towards the end she was unable to fulfill at least a small part of her ambitious but near impossible plans. Lying on her deathbed, she forbade the servants and guards to call for her husband, who at the time was busy taking part in one of the important Polish parliament sittings. Marie Louise died unexpectedly in Warsaw on 10 May 1667 and was buried in Kraków at Wawel Cathedral. John II Casimir, shocked by the sudden death of his wife and in deep grief, abdicated the Polish throne a year later as he was not able by himself to cope with the heavy burden of responsibility of a Polish ruler.

Marie Louise founded the first Polish newspaper, Merkuriusz Polski (The Polish Mercury, 1661), and the first Polish convent of the Order of the Visitation of Holy Mary (1654). She supported Tito Livio Burattini, an Italian polymath (one of the first Egyptologists), who also designed "flying machines". He lived in Poland since the early 1650s. As a former salonist in France, she opened a literary salon in Poland, the first in the country. She was the patron of the next king, John III Sobieski, who would follow the example of trying to reform Poland's legal system, also without major successes.

Rumours pointed her out as the mother of her successor as queen, Marie Casimire, through adultery, but there are no confirmation to these rumours. She certainly had a close relationship with Marie Casimire, whom she educated on political matters and according to Robert Nisbet Bain, spoiled her in the process. After Marie Louise had to give up her project of bringing Duke d'Enghien to Poland, she centred her hope on Sobieski and the marriage between her two protegés (which happened).

The long reign of Marie Louise Gonzaga is strictly assessed by both contemporaries and historians. Together with Bona Sforza she was without a doubt the most energetic and the most important Polish queen of the modern age, who played an instrumental role in repulsing the Swedish armies during the Deluge, but it was her stubborn nature and ambitious plans for reform that lead to her demise.

Gallery

See also
 Holy Cross Church
 Kazimierzowski Palace
 Ujazdów Castle
 Visitationist Church

References

Sources

Further reading

External links 

|-

1611 births
1667 deaths
Polish people of French descent
Nobility from Paris
Marie Louise
Remarried royal consorts
17th-century French people
17th-century Italian nobility
Polish queens consort
Grand Duchesses of Lithuania
Prussian royal consorts
Polish women in war
Burials at Wawel Cathedral
Polish Roman Catholics
Polish salon-holders
Women who experienced pregnancy loss
Daughters of monarchs